This is the discography of Ayaka Hirahara.

Discography

Studio albums

Compilation albums

Singles

Video albums
 Ayaka Hirahara Music Video Collection Vol. 1 (2005)
 Ayaka Hirahara Music Video Collection Vol. 2 (2007)

Concert DVDs
 Concert Tour 2009 "PATH of INDEPENDENCE" at JCB HALL (2009)

References 

Discographies of Japanese artists
Pop music discographies